ErP, energy-related products, are products that use energy, or that do not use energy but have an indirect impact on energy consumption, such as water using devices, building insulation products, windows, etc. Compared to ErP, energy-using products (EuP) are products which are dependent on energy input (electricity etc.).
All ErP and EuP are subject to energy efficiency requirements.

ErP Directive
In November 2009, the Eco-Design Directive EuP was replaced with the new energy-related products directive (ErP) 2009/125/EC. The old directive for energy using products only covered products that used energy, such as washing machines or computers. The new ErP-Directive covers products under the old EuP Directive as well as products that are energy-related and do not directly use energy such as water-saving taps and showerheads. With this directive, the European Union regulator laid the groundwork for specific implementing measures affecting a broad range of EuP and ErP. The goal is the reduction of energy along the supply chain: from the design stage throughout production, transport, packaging and so on. Products that comply with this directive are easily recognized by carrying the CE marking. In this case, the CE mark covers product safety and energy efficiency requirements.

See also
European Ecodesign Directive

References

External links
 Webinar - Introduction to the ErP Directive
 ErP Directive - TÜV SÜD Product Service
 Essential links for CE Marking in the UK

Energy conservation